The Philippine pied fantail (Rhipidura nigritorquis) is a species of bird in the family Rhipiduridae.  It was formerly considered conspecific with the Malaysian pied fantail.

Its natural habitat is subtropical or tropical moist lowland forests.

Taxonomy
Other names by which this bird is referred to are Maria Capra (Philippines), and tarerekoy (Visayas, Philippines).

Relationship with other birds
It is common to the Philippines, mostly in the Mindanao and raises its tail to attract females. They are mostly black and white in color and normal in shape. It flies together/commonly with Eurasian tree sparrows and chestnut munias.

References

Philippine pied fantail
Endemic birds of the Philippines
Philippine pied fantail